Doberlug-Kirchhain is a German town in the district of Elbe-Elster, Lower Lusatia, Brandenburg.

History
937. The town of Kirchhain was built by Margrave Gero. A document written in 1005 mentions the town Doberlug (Dobraluh) for the first time. In 1165 the Cistercian Dobrilugk Abbey was founded by Margrave Dietrich of Landsberg.

1235. Kirchhain received market-rights. In 1431 the Hussites destroyed the town of Doberlug and the abbey was devastated. In 1637 and 1643 the Swedes destroyed Kirchhain.

From 1815 to 1947, Doberlug and Kirchhain were part of the Prussian Province of Brandenburg.

1848. The jurisdictions of Doberlug and Kirchhain were unified, but the actual merger of the two towns did not take place until over one hundred years later, in 1950.

During World War II, Kirchhain was taken by the Red Army on 23 April 1945.

From 1952 to 1990, Doberlug-Kirchhain was part of the Bezirk Cottbus of East Germany.

On August 28, 1992, the Amt Doberlug-Kirchhain was created to streamline the administration of the town together with the surrounding 8 small municipalities. Nexdorf and Frankena later joined as well. The municipalities incorporated into the town were Frankena (2000), Dübrichen, Hennersdorf, Nexdorf, Prießen and Werenzhain (2001), and Buchhain (2002). The remaining three municipalities Arenzhain, Trebbus and Lugau were incorporated on October 26, 2003, thus ending the history of the Amt.

Demography

Coat of arms
The coat of arms of the town shows the town hall with three towers topped with yellow flags. Below is a green ring. On top are two clouds and rays of the sun. The shield is blue, and shaped like a leather sheet, symbolizing the history of the city as a tannery center. The coat of arms was created in 1950 by combining the symbols of the coats of arms of Doberlug and Kirchhain: the green ring and the sun are taken from the arms of Doberlug, while the town hall is from those of Kirchhain.

Twin towns
Doberlug-Kirchhain is twinned with Hemer in North Rhine-Westphalia and Kirchhain in Hesse.

Notable natives and residents

Kirchhain
 Daniel Schade (1601–1662), Musician
 Karl Gustav von Berneck (1803–1871), writer
 Guido Jendritzko (born 1925), sculptor and painter
 Catrin Große (born 1964 in Finsterwalde), painter, graphic designer and sculptor

Doberlug
 Heinrich Clauren (1771–1854), also Carl Gottlieb Samuel Heun, writer
 Otto Fridolin Fritzsche (1812–1896), theologist
 Hermann Wilhelm Vogel (1834–1898), chemist
 Eduard Köllner, (1839–1891), composer of  Festhymne zur 100 jährigen Jubelfeier der Unabhängigkeitserklärung der Vereinigten Staaten Nordamerikas (Hymn for the Independence Day 1876)

Photogallery

References

External links

Localities in Elbe-Elster